Lake Bästeträsk is a freshwater lake located in the northern part of the Swedish island of Gotland. It is the largest lake on the island.

Geography 
The lake is located at the north end of Gotland,  from the Baltic Sea. It has three islands: Falholmen, Storholmen and Lillholmen. The lake forms  of the  Bästeträsk nature reserve, one of the largest on Gotland. With an area of  it is the largest lake on the island. Despite its size, the maximum depth is only  and in most places the lake is considerably shallower.

Geology 
The wall has been displaced or pushed out by the expanding ice during the winter. The bottom of the lake is made up of blocks of stone, especially in the shallower parts, and sediments.

Lake Bästeträsk is connected to the Baltic Sea through the stream Arån, which is a breeding ground for sea trout.

Biology 
Bästeträsk is a freshwater reserve with very clean inflows, a number of them has the same aspects as drinking water. The water has a greenish tint with low nutrient content, making the lake devoid of vegetation save for stands of Chara aspera, Chara tomentosa, Chara globularis and the only occurrence in Sweden of Nitella tenuissima. It is inhabited by species such as northern pike, perch, roach, rudd, tench, European bullhead and whitefish. The lake was stocked with crayfish during the 1920s. A number of rare lichens and polyporales can be found in the nature reserve surrounding the lake, along with the land snail Cochlicopa nitens. The islands in the lake have a large colony of common eider.

Uses 
The area around Bästeträsk has been used for quarrying limestone since the 1650s. Production ceased in 1990, but traces of the industry remain. Most visible are the two smaller quarry lakes to the north of the lake. The northwest of these lakes, "The Blue Lagoon", is a well visited swimming site.

The lake's outflow in the north was dammed up and led through a culvert for production of hydroelectricity following a decision in 1939.  only the culvert remains.

In winter the lake is sometimes used for tour skating.

References 

Bastetrask
Gotland